is a Japanese footballer who plays for Vegalta Sendai.

Career
After winning the 2016 National Championship with Aomori Yamada High School, Yuta Goke joined J1 League club Vissel Kobe for 2018 season. He also found his first goal in J. League Cup in April against V-Varen Nagasaki. 

From the 2021 season, changed to the uniform number "7" worn by David Villa. Grow through various positions.

From 2023, he will return to Vegalta Sendai, where he was raised until junior high school.

Club statistics
Updated to 13 December 2022.

References

External links

Profile at Vissel Kobe

1999 births
Living people
Association football people from Miyagi Prefecture
Japanese footballers
Association football midfielders
Vissel Kobe players
Vegalta Sendai players
J1 League players
J2 League players
Japan under-20 international footballers